Third party may refer to:

Business
 Third-party source, a supplier company not owned by the buyer or seller
 Third-party beneficiary, a person who could sue on a contract, despite not being an active party
 Third-party insurance, such as a Vehicle insurance

Politics
 Third party (politics), any party contending for votes that failed to outpoll either of its two strongest rivals
 Third party (United States), a US political term for parties other than the Democrats or Republicans
 Third party (SIPO), in Ireland, those who receive political donations but do not run for election

Arts and entertainment
 3rd Party, a 1990s American music group
 Third Party (album), by Blue Sky Black Death and Alexander Chen, 2010
 Third Party (DJs), a British DJ duo
 The Third Party, a 2016 Filipino romantic comedy drama film

See also
 
 
 Third person (disambiguation)
 3P (disambiguation)